Miraclathurella mendozana is a species of sea snail, a marine gastropod mollusk in the family Pseudomelatomidae, the turrids.

Description

Distribution
This species occurs in the Pacific Ocean from Mexico to Panama.

References

External links
 
 Gastropods.com: Miraclathurella mendozana

mendozana
Gastropods described in 1971